Harry Harper (1895–1963) was a baseball player.

Harry Harper may also refer to:

Harry Harper (Casualty), a character from the TV series Casualty
Herbert Harper (cricketer) (1889–1983), also known as Harry, English cricketer
Harry Harper, character in Aren't Men Beasts!

See also
Henry Harper (disambiguation)
Harold Harper (disambiguation)